Rapidan Historic District is a national historic district located at Rapidan, in Culpeper County and Orange County, Virginia. It encompasses 34 contributing buildings in the crossroads village of Rapidan.  They include three churches, a post office, a commercial building, one meeting hall, two railroad depots, twenty-one residences, and six outbuildings.  Notable buildings include the Emmanuel Episcopal Church (1874), "Annandale" (c. 1825), the Rapidan Trading Post (1903), Rapidan Post Office (1914), Lower Rapidan Baptist Church (1914), Rapidan Passenger Depot (c. 1890), and the Peyton-Grhby House (c. 1890).  Also located in the district is the separately listed Waddell Memorial Presbyterian Church.

It was listed on the National Register of Historic Places in 1987.

References

Historic districts in Orange County, Virginia
Victorian architecture in Virginia
Italianate architecture in Virginia
Historic districts in Culpeper County, Virginia
National Register of Historic Places in Culpeper County, Virginia
National Register of Historic Places in Orange County, Virginia
Historic districts on the National Register of Historic Places in Virginia